Estíbaliz Montes de Oca Muñoz (born 20 February 1999) is a footballer who plays as a midfielder for Sundsvalls DFF. Born in Sweden, she has been called up to represent Chile internationally.

Career

Club career

Montes de Oca started her career with Swedish top flight side AIK, where she suffered relegation to the Swedish second tier. In 2017, Montes de Oca signed for BP in the Swedish third tier, helping them earn promotion to the Swedish second tier.

Before the second half of 2020–21, she signed for Italian club Cesena.
Before the 2022 season, she signed for Sundsvalls DFF in the Swedish second tier.

International career

Montes de Oca has represented Sweden at under-15 level in 2013 and Chile at under-17 level in the 2016 South American Championship.

Montes de Oca is eligible to represent Chile internationally through her parents. In October 2021, she was called-up to the Chile squad for friendly matches against Colombia, but she didn't make any appearance.

Personal life
She holds dual nationality Swedish-Chilean since her parents are Chilean.

References

External links
  

1999 births
Living people
Footballers from Stockholm
Swedish women's footballers
Sweden women's youth international footballers
Swedish people of Chilean descent
Sportspeople of Chilean descent
Citizens of Chile through descent
Chilean women's footballers
Chile women's youth international footballers
AIK Fotboll (women) players
IF Brommapojkarna (women) players
Women's association football midfielders
Damallsvenskan players
Sundsvalls DFF players
Elitettan players
Expatriate women's footballers in Italy
Swedish expatriate sportspeople in Italy
Chilean expatriate sportspeople in Italy
Naturalized citizens of Chile